Xylocopa dejeanii, or Xylocopa (Zonohirsuta) dejeanii, is a species of carpenter bee. It is widely distributed in Asian countries.

References 

 http://vespa-bicolor.net/main/solitary-bees/xylocopa-dejeanii.htm
 http://animaldiversity.org/accounts/Xylocopa_dejeanii/classification/

Further reading 

Ruggiero M. (project leader), Ascher J. et al. (2013). ITIS Bees: World Bee Checklist (version Sep 2009). In: Species 2000 & ITIS Catalogue of Life, 11 March 2013 (Roskov Y., Kunze T., Paglinawan L., Orrell T., Nicolson D., Culham A., Bailly N., Kirk P., Bourgoin T., Baillargeon G., Hernandez F., De Wever A., eds). Digital resource at www.catalogueoflife.org/col/. Species 2000: Reading, UK.
John Ascher, Connal Eardley, Terry Griswold, Gabriel Melo, Andrew Polaszek, Michael Ruggiero, Paul Williams, Ken Walker, and Natapot Warrit.

External links 
 https://www.itis.gov/servlet/SingleRpt/SingleRpt?search_topic=TSN&search_value=766692

dejeanii
Hymenoptera of Asia
Insects of Asia
Fauna of Southeast Asia
Insects described in 1841